Cochylis morosana is a species of moth of the  family Tortricidae. It is found in Central Asia (Usgent, Alai, Pamir).

References

Moths described in 1899
Cochylis